Fem unga ("Five Young Ones" or "Five Young Men") is a Swedish anthology published in 1929 and the name of the literary group formed by the five young proletarian writers who contributed to it: Erik Asklund, Josef Kjellgren, Artur Lundkvist, Harry Martinson and Gustav Sandgren. Fem unga played a key role in introducing literary modernism in Swedish literature.

References

Swedish literature
1929 anthologies
Harry Martinson